Emeiquan is a group of Chinese martial arts from Mount Emei in Sichuan Province, one of the major "Martial Mountains". It is known for its swiftness and flexibility. Folklore and literary fiction associates it with women. 

Emeiquan encompasses a wide range of systems, and is known for its animal-based fighting methods owing to the abundant wildlife of the mountain range, particularly monkey style and its unique Southern styles.

Emeiquan combines both internal (from Wudangquan, Xingyiquan, Baguazhang and Tai chi) and external (from Nanquan) practices. Low stable stances with little hopping are characteristic. Jumps are executed very lightly and quickly, and its movements are very diverse. Many of its most effective techniques are derived from the use of the wrist.

Styles
Systems under the Emeiquan category include the following.
 Yumenquan
 Baimeiquan
 Huamenquan
 Hamaquan (toad boxing)
 Hudiequan (butterfly boxing)
 Panhuaquan
 Huangshanquan (eel boxing)

See also
Emei Sect

References

Chinese martial arts

fr:Emei quan